The Chicony Star Residential Building is a 35-storey,  tall residential skyscraper completed in 2019 and located in Sanchong District, New Taipei, Taiwan. Construction of the building began in 2016 and it was completed in 2019. The complex was constructed under strict requirements of preventing damage caused by earthquakes and typhoons common in Taiwan.

See also 
 List of tallest buildings in Taiwan
 List of tallest buildings in New Taipei City
 Jun Pin Yuan

References

2019 establishments in Taiwan
Residential skyscrapers in Taiwan
Skyscrapers in New Taipei
Apartment buildings in Taiwan
Residential buildings completed in 2019